Automatic identification and data capture (AIDC) refers to the methods of automatically identifying objects, collecting data about them, and entering them directly into computer systems, without human involvement. Technologies typically considered as part of AIDC include QR codes, bar codes, radio frequency identification (RFID), biometrics (like iris and facial recognition system), magnetic stripes, optical character recognition (OCR), smart cards, and voice recognition. AIDC is also commonly referred to as "Automatic Identification", "Auto-ID" and "Automatic Data Capture".

AIDC is the process or means of obtaining external data, particularly through the analysis of images, sounds, or videos. To capture data, a transducer is employed which converts the actual image or a sound into a digital file. The file is then stored and at a later time, it can be analyzed by a computer, or compared with other files in a database to verify identity or to provide authorization to enter a secured system. Capturing data can be done in various ways; the best method depends on application.

In biometric security systems, capture is the acquisition of or the process of acquiring and identifying characteristics such as finger image, palm image, facial image, iris print, or voiceprint which involves audio data, and the rest all involve video data.

Radio-frequency identification is relatively a new AIDC technology, which was first developed in the 1980s. The technology acts as a base in automated data collection, identification, and analysis systems worldwide. RFID has found its importance in a wide range of markets, including livestock identification and Automated Vehicle Identification (AVI) systems because of its capability to track moving objects. These automated wireless AIDC systems are effective in manufacturing environments where barcode labels could not survive.

Overview of automatic identification methods 

Nearly all the automatic identification technologies consist of three principal components, which also comprise the sequential steps in AIDC:
 Data encoder. A code is a set of symbols or signals that usually represent alphanumeric characters. When data are encoded, the characters are translated into machine-readable code. A label or tag containing the encoded data is attached to the item that is to be identified.
 Machine reader or scanner. This device reads the encoded data, converting them to an alternative form, typically an electrical analog signal.
 Data decoder. This component transforms the electrical signal into digital data and finally  back into the original alphanumeric characters.

Capturing data from printed documents
One of the most useful application tasks of data capture is collecting information from paper documents and saving it into databases (CMS, ECM, and other systems). There are several types of basic technologies used for data capture according to the data type:

OCR – for printed text recognition
ICR – for hand-printed text recognition
OMR – for marks recognition
OBR – for barcodes recognition
BCR – for bar code recognition
DLR – for document layer recognition

These basic technologies allow extracting information from paper documents for further processing in the enterprise information systems such as ERP, CRM, and others.

The documents for data capture can be divided into 3 groups: structured, semi-structured, and unstructured.

Structured documents (questionnaires, tests, insurance forms, tax returns, ballots, etc.) have completely the same structure and appearance. It is the easiest type for data capture because every data field is located at the same place for all documents.

Semi-structured documents (invoices, purchase orders, waybills, etc.) have the same structure, but their appearance depends on several items and other parameters. Capturing data from these documents is a complex, but solvable task.

Unstructured documents (letters, contracts, articles, etc.) could be flexible with structure and appearance.

The Internet and the future

Advocates for the growth of AIDC systems argue that AIDC has the potential to greatly increase industrial efficiency and general quality of life. If widely implemented, the technology could reduce or eliminate counterfeiting, theft, and product waste, while improving the efficiency of supply chains. However, others have voiced criticisms of the potential expansion of AIDC systems into everyday life, citing concerns over personal privacy, consent, and security. 

The global association Auto-ID Labs was founded in 1999 and is made up of 100 of the largest companies in the world such as Walmart, Coca-Cola, Gillette, Johnson & Johnson, Pfizer, Procter & Gamble, Unilever, UPS, companies working in the sector of technology such as SAP, Alien, Sun as well as five academic research centers. These are based at the following Universities; Massachusetts Institute of Technology in the USA, the University of Cambridge in the UK, the University of Adelaide in Australia, Keio University in Japan, and ETH Zurich, as well as the University of St. Gallen in Switzerland.

The Auto-ID Labs suggests a concept of a future supply chain that is based on the Internet of objects, i.e., a global application of RFID. They try to harmonize technology, processes, and organization. Research is focused on miniaturization (aiming for a size of 0.3 mm/chip), reduction in the price per single device (aiming at around $0.05 per unit), the development of innovative applications such as payment without any physical contact (Sony/Philips), domotics (clothes equipped with radio tags and intelligent washing machines), and sporting events (timing at the Berlin Marathon).

AIDC 100
AIDC 100 is a professional organization for the automatic identification and data capture (AIDC) industry. This group is composed of individuals who made substantial contributions to the advancement of the industry. Increasing business's understanding of AIDC processes and technologies are the primary goals of the organization.

See also

 Automated species identification
 Automatic equipment identification
 Automatic number-plate recognition
 Auto-ID Labs
 Device management
 Field Service Management
 Mobile Enterprise
 Mobile Asset Management
 Ubiquitous computing
 Ubiquitous Commerce
 Digital Mailroom
 Face recognition
 Data privacy

References

 
Encodings
Multimodal interaction
Human–computer interaction
Radio-frequency identification